House of the Rising Sun is a 2011 American action drama film starring Dave Bautista. Filming took place in Grand Rapids, Michigan. The screenplay was written by Chuck Hustmyre and Brian A. Miller, based on Chuck Hustmyre's novel of the same title.

Plot
Ray Shane is an ex-vice cop trying to turn his life around after spending 5 years in prison. He works as the head of security for The House of the Rising Sun, a strip club and illegal gambling den. During a night on the job, a masked gang hold him at gunpoint to rob the strip joint of $300,000, ending with the club owner's son, Peter, getting killed in the shootout. When the police arrive, they suspect Ray led the robbery.

Ray's relationship with Jenny Porter is rocky following her regretful affair with Tony, the right-hand man of his boss, when he was imprisoned. Ray is enlisted by his boss Vinnie Marcella to track down his son's killers. He finds help from his former police colleague Jimmy LaGrange, who lends him information in his pursuit, but Vinnie and Tony start to believe they wrongly trusted him and that he is behind the robbery.

That night, Tony and his partner, Joey, attack Ray at his motel. After escaping, Ray stays with Jenny at her apartment, although Tony attempts to find him there, but Jenny does not let him in. During their conversation, She tells Ray she became a call girl only until his prison sentence ended. He forgives her and they make love. The next day, Ray meets with Charlie Blackstone, finding out Tony is planning to take over his boss Vinnie's position. He gets more info from one of the only surviving shooters involved with the robbery; the robbery was for an unknown inside man who killed the other shooters. The shooter refuses to bear testimony, and Ray kills him when threatened by a gun.

Tony meets with Vinnie's older brother, Carlos, who Charlie works for. However, Tony is ordered to kill Charlie upon hearing he spoke with Ray, luring Charlie out of his house to kill him while Joey kills his wife, the latter murder which leads back to Ray because of his pocket knife. On the run, with the help of Jenny, Ray discovers Tony was involved in killing the shooters. Confronting Carlos with the development, it becomes known Tony's wife Priscilla is aiding his agenda by sleeping around with Carlos and distracting him so that Tony can take over his brother Vinnie's strip club. Offended, Priscilla shoots Carlos dead, but Ray avoids a bullet and shoots her dead.

Ray calls the police. He informs Vinnie at his office they were both set up, with Tony framing Ray for the robbery and turning Vinnie's brother Carlos against Vinnie to eventually take over the club. Tony shows up with the money to confirm it as truth, and Jenny is being held hostage by his partner Joey. Tony is bitter that Carlos, who he worked with to build the company, handed it down to Vinnie, who vows revenge for the death of his son and betrayal before Tony kills him. With Tony offering $25,000, Ray's former co-vice cop Jimmy shows up to kill him for Tony, instead Jimmy gives Ray a gun causing a shoot-out. Ray takes cover, but Jimmy is hit, and Tony takes off with the money and Jenny down to the floor of the club. There, Jenny escapes with the money and tosses it to the strippers.

In the parking lot, Ray fights Tony until the police arrive, and he tries to convince them Tony did the robbery and set him up. When Tony shoots towards Jenny, the police shoot him down. Jenny pleads to the police that Ray is innocent, but her testimony is insufficient and they still arrest him and take him into custody. In the end, Jenny is able to kiss Ray for a final time before he is driven off back to prison.

Cast
 Dave Bautista as Ray Shane
 Amy Smart as Jenny Porter
 Danny Trejo as Carlos Marcella
 Lyle Kanouse as Vinnie Marcella
 John G. Carbone as Pete Marcella
 Dominic Purcell as Tony Zello
 Debra Harrison-Lowe as Priscilla Zello
 Franz Klain as Joey
 Craig Fairbrass as Charlie Blackstone
 Brian Vander Ark as Detective Jimmy LaGrange
 Tim Fields as Detective Carl Landry
 Roy Oraschin as Dylan Sylvester
 Brian A. Miller as Mack
 Jesse Pruett as Detective Slattery
 Natalie Light as Dallas
 Imani Lee as Cleo
 Jude S. Walko as Druggie

Reception

Mike Scott of the Times-Picayune said "There's potential for a by-the-numbers underworld detective story. Unfortunately, that potential never is realized in Miller's film, a flaccid and convoluted tale of double-crosses."

Brian Orndorf said "Muddled and frequently comatose, the picture yearns to be a turbulent ride of crooks and cops, yet it never rises to the occasion, generating a feeble mystery sold by a cast of brutes trying to pass themselves off as actors."

Awards
Wins
 Action On Film International Film Festival: Action on Film Award; 2011. Bautista also won the Performer of the Year award for this film.

References

External links
 
 
 

2011 direct-to-video films
2011 films
American action drama films
Films shot in Michigan
Films about striptease
2010s English-language films
Films directed by Brian A. Miller
2010s American films